Judithe Hernández (born 1948) is an American artist and educator, she is known as a muralist, pastel artist, and painter. She a pioneer of the Chicano art movement and a former member of the art collective Los Four. She is based in Los Angeles, California and previously lived in Chicago.

She first received acclaim in the 1970s as a muralist her artistic practice shifted over time and now is centered on works-on-paper, principally pastels, which frequently incorporate indigenist imagery and the social-political tension of gender roles.

In 1974, she became the fifth member, and only woman, in Los Four, the influential and celebrated East Los Angeles Chicano artist collective, along with Carlos Almaraz, Frank Romero, Robert de la Rocha, and Gilbert Luján. And she was later briefly part of the art collective, Centro de Arte Público along with Barbara Carrasco and Dolores Guerrero-Cruz. As early as 1970, Hernández was involved in the initial efforts of Chicano artists in East Los Angeles to organize. Of this experience, Hernández later said that "Often I was literally the only female at meetings who was not a girlfriend or wife, but an active artist participant."

Early life and education 

Judithe Hernández was born in 1948 in Los Angeles, California. She attended Otis College of Art and Design (formally called Otis Art Institute) where she received her BFA degree in 1972, and then her MFA degree in 1979.

When she enrolled at Otis College in 1969, she was only one of five Mexican-American students enrolled. While attending graduate school in 1972 at Otis College, she met her classmate, Carlos Almaraz. Through her friendship with Almaraz, she was invited as the fifth member to join Los Four art collective in 1974.

During her time at Otis College, Hernández studied drawing with the renowned African-American artist Charles White who became a mentor and important influence on her development as an artist. Hernández attributes much of her success to the teachers and professors who recognized her ability and encouraged her to pursue her career as an artist.

In 1971, while working as the illustrator of the Aztlán Journal, published by the UCLA Chicano Studies Research Center, Hernández illustrated the first volume of poetry by the celebrated poet Alurista, Floricanto en Aztlán. In 2013, the 40th anniversary edition of the book received three prizes at the International Latino Book awards.

Career

1970s 
After graduation, she and Almaraz collaborated with El Teatro Campesino, worked on behalf of the United Farm Workers (UFW), and as members of the Concilio de Arte Popular (CAP), they worked to create an organization that united Chicano artists across the state of California. Chicano artist organizations such as the Royal Chicano Air Force of Sacramento; Galeria de la Raza, in San Francisco, and the artists of Chicano Park in San Diego were among those who participated in CAP in the 1970s.

In 1981, she and seven other Chicano muralists painted murals on canvas inside the Craft and Folk Art Museum in Los Angeles for an exhibition entitled The Murals of Aztlán. The artists were criticized in Artweek magazine by reviewer Shifra Goldman for "shedding … their cultural identity and political militance" in order to "enter the mainstream as competitive professionals." Hernández responded "why should changes in my work and socio-political attitudes be construed as compromising my commitment … while in another artist the same would be construed as personal and professional growth?"

In July 1989, marked the first exhibition of Chicano art in Europe, Les Démon des Anges, at Centre de Recherche et de Développement Culturel (CRDC) in Nantes, France. Included in the exhibition were sixteen Chicano artists (of which were three women) and this event brought international significance to Hernández's work.

1980s 
In the early 1980s Hernández relocated to Chicago and lived there for more than 25 years before returning to Los Angeles in 2010. Her final exhibition in Chicago was a major solo exhibition of new work at the National Museum of Mexican Art. La Vida Sobre Papel, opened in January 2011 and included several new series of work, one of which was the noted serial murders of women in Ciudad Juárez.  According to the Chicago Weekly, "The only thing as conspicuous as the artist's skill is her message: being human is hard, a woman harder, and life as a Latina occasionally downright grisly." Hernandez says she will continue working on the series until the 800-2000 deaths are acknowledged by the Mexican government.

2000s 
In 2011, Hernández was among a select group of artists whose contributions to the art of Los Angeles were honored in multiple exhibitions which were part of the sweeping arts initiative known as Pacific Standard Time: Art in L.A., 1945–1980 (PST), funded by the Getty Foundation. In 2012 Hernández was the recipient of two major awards; the prestigious C.O.L.A. Fellowship (City of Los Angeles Individual Artist Fellowship) for 2013, as well as the coveted commission to create public art for the Terminus Station of Metro EXPO LINE at Colorado & 4th Street in Santa Monica by the Metropolitan Transportation Authority of Los Angeles. The Expo Line Downtown Santa Monica station opened on May 20, 2016. "The station at the edge of the continent" features 24 mosaic glass panels designed by Hernández positioned over its two-passenger platforms. Collectively, the panels are known at "L.A. Sonata" and depict the passage of the day and the seasons using a montage of cultural icons representing the cultural and ethnic diversity of Los Angeles. It is expected to be one of the most traveled light-rail lines in the U.S.

2010s 
In 2013, Hernández was one of 72 artists chosen for the first major exhibition of contemporary American artists of Latino descent at the Smithsonian American Art Museum from works in their permanent collection. "Our America: The Latino Presence in American Art" opened in October 2013.  After closing in January 2014, the exhibition traveled to several other museums throughout the United States, including the Crocker Museum in California, the Utah Museum of Fine Arts in Salt Lake City, and the Hunter Museum of Art in Tennessee. In 2017, Hernández will again have work in multiple exhibitions of the Getty Foundation sponsored Pacific Standard Time LA/LA which explores the influence of Latin American art on the art of Los Angeles. Her work "The Purification" was selected as a featured promotional image for PST LA/LA.

Over her 50-year career, she has established a significant record of exhibition and acquisition of her work by major public and private collections; which include the Museum of Modern Art, Smithsonian American Art Museum, the Pennsylvania Academy of Fine Art, the National Museum of Mexican Art, the Museum of Latin American Art, the Crocker Art Museum, the Gerald Buck Collection, and the Bank of America. She has been the recipient of the prestigious University of Chicago Artist-in-Residence at the Center for the Study of Race, Politics, & Culture, the C.O.L.A. Fellowship, and the Comisión Femenil Mexicana Nacional Award for Achievement in the Fine Arts. In 2018, the importance of her status as an American artist was confirmed when the Pulitzer Prize winning Chief Art Critic of the Los Angeles, Christopher Knight, reviewed her solo exhibition at MOLAA and wrote "...Hernández’s art is churned by her marvelous color sense, which unmoors any illustrative limits of the genre."

In 2018, Hernández was honored by the National Museum of Mexican Art in Chicago with the Sor Juana Legacy Award for "outstanding lifetime contributions to arts" and in August she will become the first American-born Latina to open a solo exhibition at the Museum of Latin American Art. Also in 2018, her work "La Virgen del la Oscuridad" will become the featured image of the newly redesigned permanent exhibition "Becoming Los Angeles" of the Natural History Museum of Los Angeles County which re-opens in May. In 2019, her newest mural commission marks the return of her artistic presence to the historic district of downtown Los Angeles when her seven-story mural "La Nueva Reina de Los Angeles" is installed on the northwest residential tower of La Plaza Village at Broadway and the Hollywood Freeway.

She is married to designer Morton Neikrug, and together they have one daughter.

Awards and collections 
She received the Anonymous Was A Woman Award in 2021. She was awarded an Individual Artist Fellowship in 2013 from the City of Los Angeles. She served as an artist in residence in 2011 at the University of Chicago, in the Center for the Study of Race, Politics, and Culture.

Hernández's work is in various public collections including the Museum of Modern Art (MoMA), Crocker Art Museum, the National Museum of Mexican Art, the Vincent Price Art Museum, El Paso Museum of Art, Pennsylvania Academy of Fine Art, Smithsonian American Art Museum, Museum of Latin American Art, Los Angeles County Museum of Art (LACMA), The Cheech Marin Center for Chicano Art, Culture & Industry, and others.

Solo exhibitions
 2021 – Judithe Hernández: Dreams on Paper, Monica King Contemporary, New York City, New York
 2018 – A Dream is the Shadow of Something Real, Museum of Latin American Art (MOLAA), Long Beach, California
 2011 – La Vida Sobre Papel, National Museum of Mexican Art, Chicago, Illinois.
 2010 – What Dreams May Come / Qué Sueños Quizás Vengan, Woman Made Gallery, Chicago, Illinois
 1983 – Judithe Hernández: Works on Paper, Cayman Gallery, New York City, New York
 1980 – A Decade of a Woman's Work, Solart Gallery, San Diego, California
 1979 – Virgen, Madre, Mujer: Imágenes de la Mujer Chicana, Casa de la Raza, Santa Barbara, California
 1978 – Mi Arte, Mi Raza, Los Angeles Municipal Art Gallery, Los Angeles, California

Group exhibitions 
This is a list of select group exhibitions by Hernández, listed by date:
 2020 – Printing the Revolution! The Rise and Impact of Chicano Graphics, 1965 to Now. Smithsonian American Art Museum, Washington DC
 2019 – LIFE MODEL: Charles White and His Students, Los Angeles County Museum of Art (LACMA), Los Angeles, California
 2017 – Judithe Hernández & Patssi Valdez: Two Paths One Journey, Millard Sheets Center for the Arts, Pomona, California
 2015–2016 – Our America: The Latino Presence in American Art, (traveling group exhibition), Delaware Museum of Art, Allentown Art Museum, Museum of Fine Arts, St. Petersburg, Arkansas Arts Center, Utah Museum of Fine Arts
 2009 – Judithe Hernández and Sergio Gomez: Through the Labyrinth, President's Gallery, Chicago State University, Chicago, Illinois
 2009 – Feminist Ecology: Women and the Earth, Koehnline Museum, Chicago, Illinois
 1989–1990 – Les Démon des Anges, (traveling group exhibition), Centre de Recherche et de Développement Culturel (CRDC), Nantes, France; Centro de Arte Contemporaño Santa Monica, Barcelona, Spain; Espace Lyonnais d'Art Contemporain, Lyon, France; Kulturerhuset, Stockholm, Sweden
 1978 – The Aesthetics of Graffiti, curated by Rolando Castellón, San Francisco Museum of Modern Art (SFMoMA), San Francisco, California
 1974 – Los Four en Longo, Long Beach Museum of Art, Long Beach, California

Public art

References

Further reading 
 Interview with Judithe Hernandez, 1998 Mar. 28, Archives of American Art, Smithsonian Institution

External links 
 

American contemporary painters
American muralists
American artists of Mexican descent
1948 births
Living people
Artists from Los Angeles
Hispanic and Latino American women in the arts
Hispanic and Latino American culture in Los Angeles
Otis College of Art and Design alumni
20th-century American artists
21st-century American artists
20th-century American women artists
21st-century American women artists
Women muralists
Hispanic and Latino American artists
American women painters
Pastel artists